Duplitized film was a type of motion picture print film stock used for some two-color natural color processes. It was introduced by Eastman Kodak around 1913. The stock was of standard gauge and thickness, but it had a photographic emulsion coated on both sides of the film base instead of on one surface only.

In color film processes such as Cinecolor and Prizma, two black-and-white negatives photographed through red and blue-green filters, or by an equivalent bipack method, were photographically printed onto opposite sides of the duplitized film. Because its emulsion was sensitive only to blue light, a temporary yellow dye incorporated into the film prevented each printing light from also exposing the emulsion on the other side. The exposed film was developed like ordinary black-and-white film, producing a series of black-and-white silver images on each side. These were then chemically converted into single-color images of a color roughly complementary to that being used for the images on the other side and to the color of the camera filter used when filming them. The resulting superimposed pairs of transparent single-color images, projected onto a screen or viewed directly, could reproduce a limited but useful and sometimes very pleasing range of color. It was mainly in the specifics of the chemistry, apparatus and procedures used to convert the silver images into color-toned ones that the several commercial processes based on the use of duplitized film differed significantly.

Large sheets of duplitized film were sometimes used for medical X-ray photography. The double emulsion increased the overall sensitivity of the film, reducing the X-ray exposure required. Duplitized film of any kind was not suitable for ordinary camera use, due to the loss of image quality that would result from the light becoming diffused as it passed through the several layers, but with X-ray shadows that was not a problem.

See also
Bi-pack color
Color motion picture film

Film and video technology